"Move to Miami" is a song by Spanish singer Enrique Iglesias featuring rapper Pitbull. It was released by RCA Records and Sony Music Latin on 3 May 2018. The track was written by Iglesias, Pitbull, Jorge Gomez, Bilal Hajji, Jimmy Joker, Marty James, Servando Primera, José Garcia, and its producers J.R. Rotem, Nitti Gritti and Wuki. This is Iglesias' first full English single since "I'm a Freak" (2014).

Background
The song follows "El Baño", released in January 2018. This is the twelfth collaboration between Iglesias and Pitbull, and their first since "Messin' Around" (2016). Iglesias and Pitbull also toured together on the Enrique Iglesias and Pitbull Live tour in 2017.

Music video
A lyric video for the song was uploaded on Iglesias' YouTube channel on 3 May 2018, and the official music video featuring both Iglesias and Pitbull was released on 9 May 2018. The video has since garnered over 60 million views as of April, 2020. The music video was directed by Fernando Lugo and the concept for the music video was created by Iglesias' longtime creative director and collaborator Yasha Malekzad. The video was produced by Artist Preserve.

In pop culture

"Move to Miami" is included in the soundtrack for the film, Impractical Jokers: The Movie.

Track listing

Personnel
 J.R. Rotem – production
 Nitti Gritti – production
 Wuki – production
 Jorge Gomez – miscellaneous production
 Jimmy Joker – miscellaneous production
 IAmChino – miscellaneous production
 Bilal Hajji – miscellaneous production
 Marty James – background vocals
 Carlos Paucar – vocal production and mix engineering
 Al Burna – record engineering
 David Hopkins – engineering assistance
 Randy Merrill – master engineering
Credits adapted from Qobuz.

Charts

Weekly charts

Year-end charts

Certifications

References

2018 singles
2018 songs
Enrique Iglesias songs
Pitbull (rapper) songs
Songs written by Bilal Hajji
Songs written by Enrique Iglesias
Songs written by J. R. Rotem
Songs written by Pitbull (rapper)
Songs written by Jimmy Thörnfeldt
Songs written by Marty James